Dahaneh-ye Bagh (also Romanized as Dahaneh-ye Bāgh and Dahaneh-e Bāgh) is a village in Gavkan Rural District, in the Central District of Rigan County, Kerman Province, Iran. At the 2006 census, its population was 30, in 9 families.

References 

Populated places in Rigan County